The Railway Mission is a British mission devoted to the rail industry.  It was founded in 1881 based in mission halls, and now operates a chaplaincy service. In the early days of the Railway Mission there were a number of mission halls at railway stations throughout the country, including one at Bury St. Edmunds, completed in 1900, and a 1906 building at Salisbury.  
An excellent example of a Railway Mission Hall is to be found at Norwich
Prince of Wales Road Evangelical Church.

The Railway Mission is a care provider to the rail industry and British Transport Police through the provision of The National Rail Chaplaincy Service (NRCS). Operating in partnership with London City Mission, the Railway Mission is the principal partner in the NRCS which provides around 25 mainly full-time chaplains to the Railways enabling pastoral care across the whole of the mainland UK railway network. The National Rail Chaplaincy Service (NRCS) is designed to enhance and support the chain of care provided by the rail businesses.

Information about the Railway Mission

Overview
The British Railway Mission was founded in 1881 to communicate the Christian Gospel to the people working in the railway and associated industries. The railway industry has undergone dramatic changes over the years, but those who work throughout the modern network continue to face many challenges and problems in the 21st century.

The Mission's founding objective was "the moral and spiritual advancement of railway employees of all ages". That objective is still the driving force of the Mission as it seeks to provide independent confidential help and support to any rail industry employee, whether active or retired, at home, hospital or workplace.

For more than a century successive railway managements from board to local level have given much encouragement to the work of the Railway Mission. As well as support from the railways themselves the Railway Mission relies on funding from individual donations to finance its continuing work and expansion of the network of chaplains.

Pastoral care
"Meeting People... Meeting Needs..." is the strap line for the work of the mission. Marriage breakdown, domestic upheaval, serious illness, bereavement, alcohol and drug dependency – can all be deeply distressing and affect not only the quality of the life of the person concerned but also their families and colleagues. Increasing stress may be experienced as the rail industry develops in the 21st century. The work of the chaplains complements that of the welfare services offered by employers. Together we seek to ensure that all employees receive the pastoral care that they need. The Railway Mission is a 7-day a week, 24 hours a day service – just like the rail industry itself. The Mission's chaplains are called to emergency situations and can be relied upon to give careful, meaningful help and advice.

International Railway Mission (IRM)

International Railway Mission is an interdenominational federation, which connects Christian fellowships with rail staff all over Europe. IRM holds every three years an inspiring conference and leisure week. Where the members and supporters of the different Railway Missions can exchange experiences and enjoy fellowship with other participants. Since the foundation of the IRM in 1926 nine countries have been added to the federation. The newest member is the Netherlands (2007). Contacts to North America and India are in progress.

Countries
Austria: Gemeinschaft Gläubiger Eisenbahner Österreichs
Germany: Christliche Vereinigung Deutscher Eisenbahner – Eisenbahnermission (CVDE)
Great Britain: British Railway Mission (BRM)
Nederland: Nederlands Netwerk van Christenen in die Spoorwegbranche (NNCS)
Switzerland: Evangelisch christliches Verkehrspersonal der Schweiz (ECV)
United States: Railroad Evangelistic Association
Finland: Railway Mission of Finland

References

External links 
Home Page UK Railway Mission
Home Page EU Railway Mission
Friday, 16 November, 2001, Memorial stone and plaque unveiled to seven-year-old Sophie George, and Kymberley Allcock, who was eight
The Culross Mission Chaplain at Kings Cross
Villagers honour train crash dead Humphrey Gillott, Railway Chaplain prayed for those in the rescue who had seen "difficult scenes".
Parishioners first at crash site
7th of July 2005 The aftermath of the London bombs
Transform Work UK
Railway Mission Calendar Around 44,000 are distributed around the UK Railway each year

Christian missions
Rail transport in Great Britain
Christian organisations based in the United Kingdom